The 22nd Filipino Academy of Movie Arts and Sciences Awards Night was held in 1975.  This ceremony gave recognition to the movies that was made for the year 1974.

The year 1974, was a banner year for the Philippine movie industry, producing quality movies like Tinimbang Ka Ngunit Kulang, Tatlo, Dalawa, Isa; Ang Pinakamagandang Hayop sa Balat ng Lupa, Alala Mo, Daigdig; Fe, Esperanza, Caridad, John en Marsha; and Patayin Mo Sa Sindak Si Barbara.

During the awarding ceremony of FAMAS 1975, Tinimbang Ka Ngunit Kulang became the second Filipino movie to win 4 major awards including the most coveted FAMAS Award for Best Picture, Best Director, Best Actor, Best Actress but it failed win the best screenplay.

Awards

Major Awards
Winners are listed first and highlighted with boldface.

Special Awardee

References

External links
FAMAS Awards 

FAMAS Award
FAMAS
FAMAS